William Jesse Batchelor (14 November 1846 — 19 November 1917) was an English first-class cricketer, educator and clergyman.

The son of Jesse Batchelor, he was born in November 1846 at Hayes, Kent. He studied at Emmanuel College, Cambridge. He was a member of the Cambridge University Cricket Club, but declined a place in the eleven due to his busy study schedule. He did however play two first-class cricket matches for Cambridgeshire at Fenner's in 1868, against Cambridge University and Kent. He had little success in these matches, scoring 14 runs and failing to take a wicket. It was however noted by Wisden that had he taken his cricket more seriously, he may have become one of the famous bats of the day. 

After graduating from Cambridge in 1870, Batchelor became as assistant master at Leamington College. He was ordained as a deacon in 1872 and became a priest at Worcester Cathedral the following year. His ecclesiastical duties coincided with his teaching at the college, with Batchelor holding the curacies of Leek Wootton (1872–74) and Christ Church, Leamington (1874–76). Toward the end of his employment at the college, he became the headmaster of the modern side. While based in Warwickshire, Batchelor played minor cricket matches for Warwickshire, then a second-class county. He left Leamington in 1882 to become reverend of Horsleydown in London, before moving to the West Country where he became vicar at Brompton Regis in 1894. He was vicar there until 1908, after which he came reverend of Whitestone in Devon until 1916. Batchelor did in November of the following year at Epsom, shortly after his 71st birthday.

References

External links

1846 births
1917 deaths
People from Hayes, Bromley
Alumni of Emmanuel College, Cambridge
English cricketers
Cambridge Town Club cricketers
Schoolteachers from Kent
19th-century English Anglican priests
20th-century English Anglican priests